Nationalist Trinamool Youth Congress is the youth wing of the Nationalist Trinamool Congress in India.

Youth wings of political parties in India